Peter Tyndall Walwyn,  (1 July 1933 – 7 December 2017) was a British racehorse trainer. He was based at stables in the Lambourn, Berkshire, area and enjoyed his period of greatest success in the mid-1970s when he was British flat racing Champion Trainer twice.

Early life
Walwyn came from a racing family – he was the cousin of trainer Fulke Walwyn. His father was Charles "Taffy" Walwyn DSO MC. He was educated at Charterhouse School.

Career
His first job in racing was as assistant to trainer Geoffrey Brooke. He then held the licence for Helen Johnson Houghton, twin sister to Fulke Walwyn (women were not recognised as licensed trainers by the Jockey Club in those days). In October 1960 he took out a licence to train and in 1965 he moved to the stables at Seven Barrows where he spent the majority of his career. Towards the end of his career he moved to Windsor House stables in Lambourn. His principal stable jockeys were Duncan Keith, Pat Eddery and Joe Mercer.

He was one of the leading trainers in Britain during the 1970s, winning the Champion Trainer title in both 1974 and 1975. The most notable horse he trained was Grundy, winner of The Derby, Irish Derby and King George VI and Queen Elizabeth Stakes in 1975.

He retired as a trainer in 1999 but remained involved in horse racing organisations, serving as Chairman of the Lambourn Trainers Association. He was elected to honorary membership of the Jockey Club on his retirement.

Later life
Walwyn was appointed Member of the Order of the British Empire (MBE) in the 2012 New Year Honours for services to horseracing. He died on 7 December 2017, aged 84.

British Classic wins
 1,000 Guineas – (1) – Humble Duty (1970)
 Epsom Oaks – (1) – Polygamy (1974)
 Epsom Derby – (1) – Grundy (1975)

Irish Classic wins
 Irish Derby – Grundy (1975)
 Irish 2,000 Guineas – Grundy (1975)

Footnotes

References
 
 Peter Walwyn – Chairman of the LTA

1933 births
2017 deaths
British racehorse trainers
People educated at Charterhouse School
People from Lambourn
Members of the Order of the British Empire
Peter